Scientific American Mind was a bimonthly American popular science magazine concentrating on psychology, neuroscience, and related fields. By analyzing and revealing new thinking in the cognitive sciences, the magazine tries to focus on the biggest breakthroughs in these fields. Scientific American Mind is published by Nature Publishing Group which also publishes Scientific American and was established in 2004. The magazine has its headquarters in New York City.

The May/June 2017 issue was the last issue published in print, subsequent issues are available through digital platforms.

References

External links
  

Bimonthly magazines published in the United States
Online magazines published in the United States
Science and technology magazines published in the United States
Defunct magazines published in the United States
Magazines established in 2004
Magazines disestablished in 2017
Magazines published in New York City
Nature Research academic journals
Online magazines with defunct print editions
Popular science magazines
Scientific American